Daniela Magnetto Allietta (born 23 February 1996) is an Italian professional racing cyclist, who last rode for UCI Women's Team .

See also
 List of 2016 UCI Women's Teams and riders

References

External links
 

1996 births
Living people
Italian female cyclists
Place of birth missing (living people)